George Aref Nader (born May 15, 1959) is a Lebanese-American consultant, lobbyist, political adviser, and repeat sex offender. He has repeatedly acted as an unofficial liaison between United States politicians and the United Arab Emirates and Saudi Arabia and as a lobbyist for private security firm Blackwater.

Nader has served as an adviser to Crown Prince Mohammed bin Zayed Al Nahyan of the United Arab Emirates and as a consultant to Blackwater founder Erik Prince. In January 2018, special counsel Robert Mueller's investigators questioned Nader in connection to suspicions that the UAE had been involved with President Trump's 2016 campaign. In August 2016 Nader met with Donald Trump Jr., Erik Prince, and Joel Zamel, an Israeli entrepreneur and specialist in social media manipulation, to offer help to the Trump team in winning the elections. There are conflicting accounts of whether the close to 2 million dollars Nader paid Zamel after Trump's victory is attributed to that or not. In 2021, Nader pleaded guilty to violating U.S. campaign finance laws by using over 3.5 million dollars to reach out through a front to Hillary Clinton's 2016 campaign for the U.S. Presidency.

Nader has had several run-ins with the law over the years related to sexual abuse of children. He was convicted in the 1990s of transporting child pornography publications, and imprisoned in 2003 for sexually abusing ten boys in the Czech Republic. He pleaded guilty in early 2020 to flying a 14-year-old boy from Europe to the US for sex, and transporting pornography depicting child sexual abuse and bestiality.

Early life
Nader was born in Lebanon, and is a Christian. As a teenager, he moved to the US, not knowing any English. He went on to attend Cleveland State University.

Career
From 1981 through the 1990s, Nader was editor of Middle East Insight; the magazine ceased publication in 2002.

During the George H. W. Bush Administration he helped to free American hostages in Lebanon after the Iran–Contra affair. During the Clinton Administration, Nader tried unsuccessfully to broker an Israeli–Syrian peace agreement, working with Estée Lauder heir Ronald Lauder.

In the 2000s, Nader left Washington and spent most of his time in the Middle East, especially in Iraq after the 2003 Iraq invasion. During that time, Nader volunteered to act as a "shadow diplomat" connecting U.S. politicians to Middle Eastern officials. Erik Prince, founder of security firm Blackwater, hired Nader to help with contracts with the Iraqi government; in a 2010 deposition, Prince identified Nader as a "business development consultant".

In August 2016, Nader met with Donald Trump Jr. at Trump Tower offering assistance to his father's presidential campaign. Nader served as an envoy representing Saudi Arabia's Crown Prince and de facto ruler Mohammad bin Salman and Mohammed bin Zayed Al Nahyan, the Crown Prince of the Emirate of Abu Dhabi. The meeting included Erik Prince and Joel Zamel, an Israeli specialist in social media manipulation and owner of intelligence gathering firms including Wikistrat and the Psy-Group, who bragged to have received $2 million from Nader as part of the presidential campaign.

Nader attended a December 2016 meeting in New York between the United Arab Emirates officials and president-elect Donald Trump's associates Jared Kushner, Michael Flynn, and Steve Bannon. In January 2017 he was at a meeting on the Seychelles islands between the Emiratis and Erik Prince, and was present when Prince met with officials from the UAE and Kirill Dmitriev, head of state-run Russian Direct Investment Fund.

Working with Republican fundraiser Elliott Broidy in 2017, Nader funded a conference criticizing Qatar that was hosted by the Foundation for Defense of Democracies. At the time Nader and Broidy were pushing the White House to remove Secretary of State Rex Tillerson, whom the Saudis and Emiratis saw as insufficiently tough on Iran and Qatar.

In January 2018, Nader was served a grand-jury subpoena, and special counsel Robert Mueller's investigators questioned him to elicit if the UAE had tried to influence members of President Trump's campaign. Kathryn Ruemmler, an Obama-era White House counsel, was among the lawyers representing Nader.  Nader was granted immunity for information for the investigation.

Legal issues

Campaign finance charges 
In December 2019, court documents were unsealed that showed Nader had been charged in federal court with violating campaign finance laws, and falsifying records. The prosecutors alleged that, using banking industry executive Andy Khawaja as a front to obscure the source, Nader sent over $3.5 million to organizations supporting Hillary Clinton's 2016 campaign for President, in an attempt to cultivate ties with the candidate. Khawaja donated $1 million to the Trump inauguration. The documents indicated that Nader continually reported the status of his efforts to an unnamed foreign nation. A December 2021 sentencing memo indicated that Nader had pleaded guilty to "felony conspiracy to defraud the US government” in the case, and prosecutors sought a five-year sentence, to be served at the end of his ongoing 10-year child pornography sentence. (See below.)

Child sexual abuse charges 
Nader has been convicted of multiple crimes involving the sexual exploitation of minors. A 1985 charge, of receiving films and magazines from the Netherlands, depicting pre- and post-pubescent boys engaged in sexual acts, was dismissed due to an invalid search warrant. A federal court in Virginia in 1991 gave him a six-month sentence on a felony charge of transporting from pornographic videotapes from Germany, of boys about 13 or 14 years old. Prosecutors agreed to put the case under seal "due to the extremely sensitive nature of Mr. Nader’s work in the Middle East."

In 2003, he was convicted in Prague, Czech Republic, of sexually abusing ten boys, for which he served one year in prison. A spokesperson of the court told press that the crimes occurred between 1999 and 2002. In one case, at his room in the Hilton Prague Hotel, Nader requested oral sex from a 14-year-old boy. After he refused, Nader masturbated in front of him and paid him 2,000 koruna (about US$).

In January 2018 he was questioned by FBI agents working on behalf of special counsel Robert Mueller, and child pornography was incidentally found on one of his three cell phones as agents inspected it pursuant to a warrant. In June 2019 he was arrested by federal agents and charged with possession of child pornography and images of bestiality and, for a second time, transportation of child pornography, and held in jail pending trial in Virginia. Also in 2019 he was charged with having transported a 14-year-old Czech boy from Europe for sex at his Washington-area home in February 2000. Nader reached a plea deal with prosecutors: in January 2020, he pleaded guilty to charges of possession of child pornography and transportation of a minor, for which prosecutors recommended the minimum penalty of 10 years in prison; in June 2020, he received that sentence.

See also

Arab lobby in the United States
Foreign electoral intervention
Russian interference in the 2016 United States elections
Mueller Report''
Saudi Arabia–United States relations
Saudi Arabia lobby in the United States
United Arab Emirates–United States relations

References

Further reading

American businesspeople
Living people
1959 births
American people convicted of child pornography offenses
American people convicted of child sexual abuse
Cleveland State University alumni
American people imprisoned abroad
American lobbyists
Lebanese emigrants to the United States
People with acquired American citizenship
Lebanese Christians
American people of Lebanese descent